Batthyány's sanctuary lamp is a national monument, located at the corner of Báthory Street and Hold Street in Lipótváros, Budapest, Hungary. It sits on the former location of the courtyard of the New Building, where  Count Lajos Batthyány (1807–1849), the first Prime Minister of Hungary, was executed on 6th October 1849.

In 1905, architect Móric Pogány's design, a large lantern, was chosen, though construction was delayed by the First World War. The unveiling ceremony occurred on 6th October 1926, with István Lebó, the last living army PFC who served during the Hungarian Revolution of 1848, present.

This monument has been the site of several street demonstrations of opposition in 1941, 1943 and 1988.

References

1926 sculptures
1926 establishments in Hungary
Buildings and structures completed in 1926
Buildings and structures in Budapest
Monuments and memorials in Hungary
Belváros-Lipótváros
Hungarian Revolution of 1848
Culture in Budapest
History of Budapest